Events in the year 1922 in Brazil.

Incumbents

Federal government 
 President: Epitácio Pessoa (to 14 November); Artur Bernardes (from 15 November)
 Vice President: Francisco Álvaro Bueno de Paiva (to 14 November); Estácio de Albuquerque Coimbra (from 15 November)

Governors 
 Alagoas: José Fernandes de Barros Lima
 Amazonas: César do Rego Monteiro
 Bahia: José Joaquim Seabra
 Ceará: Justiniano de Serpa
 Goiás: Eugênio Rodrigues Jardim
 Maranhão: Urbano Santos (to 25 February); Raul da Cunha Machado (from 25 February)
 Mato Grosso: Francisco de Aquino Correia, then Pedro Celestino Corrêa da Costa
 Minas Gerais: 
 until 7 September: Artur Bernardes
 from 7 September: Raul Soares
 Pará: Antônio Emiliano de Sousa
 Paraíba: Sólon Barbosa de Lucena
 Paraná: Caetano Munhoz da Rocha
 Pernambuco:
 until 18 October: Severino Marques de Queirós Pinheiro
 from 18 October: Sérgio Teixeira Lins de Barros Loreto
 Piauí: João Luís Ferreira
 Rio Grande do Norte: Antonio José de Melo e Sousa
 Rio Grande do Sul: Antônio Augusto Borges de Medeiros
 Santa Catarina:
 São Paulo: 
 Sergipe:

Vice governors 
 Rio Grande do Norte:
 São Paulo:

Events 
11-18 February - Modern Art Week is held in São Paulo, marking the beginning of Brazilian Modernism.
1 March - In the Brazilian presidential election, Artur Bernardes of the Mineiro Republican Party receives 56.0% of the vote.
 5 July - The 18 of the Copacabana Fort revolt occurs in Rio de Janeiro, then Federal District of Brazil. It is the first revolt of the tenentista movement, in the context of the Brazilian Old Republic.
date unknown - Adalgisa Ferreira marries Ismael Nery.

Arts and culture

Books 
Os Bruzundangas

Films 
Do Rio a São Paulo Para Casar, directed by José Medina and starring Waldemar Moreno
O Furto dos 500 Milhões de Réis, directed by Arturo Carrari and starring José Fontana

Births 
7 January - Leopoldo Nachbin, mathematician (died 1993)
4 April - Dionísio Azevedo, actor (as Taufic Jacob; died 1994)
8 May – Dona Neuma, samba dancer (died 2000)
1 June - Bibi Ferreira, actress (as Abigail Izquierdo Ferreira) (died 2019)
5 July - Hélio Bicudo, Brazilian jurist and politician (died 2018)
7 September - Paulo Autran, actor (died 2007)
13 October - Gilberto Mendes, composer (died 2016)
26 October - Darcy Ribeiro,  anthropologist, author and politician (died 1997)

Deaths 
date unknown - Graciano dos Santos Neves, physician and politician (born 1868)
May 7 - Urbano Santos da Costa Araújo, vice president (born 1859)

References

See also 
1922 in Brazilian football

 
1920s in Brazil
Years of the 20th century in Brazil
Brazil
Brazil